Hansruedi Führer (born 24 December 1937) is a Swiss football defender who played for Switzerland in the 1966 FIFA World Cup. He also played for BSC Young Boys and Grasshopper Club Zürich.

References

1937 births
Swiss men's footballers
Switzerland international footballers
Association football defenders
BSC Young Boys players
Grasshopper Club Zürich players
FC St. Gallen players
1966 FIFA World Cup players
Living people
Footballers from Bern
FC St. Gallen managers
Swiss football managers